Crooked River Provincial Park is a 970-hectare provincial park in British Columbia, Canada. The park, named after the Crooked River, was established in 1965. It is located approximately 70 km north of Prince George, along Highway 97, and close to the town of Bear Lake.

References

External links
 Official site
 Crooked River Provincial Park at BritishColumbia.com

Provincial parks of British Columbia

Protected areas established in 1965
1965 establishments in British Columbia